College of Business Administration may refer to: 

a college or school of business [administration] at a university or college
College of Business Administration (Saudi Arabia)

See also